Abbey Dore is a village and civil parish in Herefordshire, England, known for Dore Abbey, a 12th-century Cistercian abbey, which was expanded in the 13th century.

The name Abbey Dore came into being in the 18th century, combining the Modern English word abbey for the Cistercian abbey in the village and the river name dore from Primitive Welsh meaning 'water'.

The village is situated in the Golden Valley, and has a population of 342, increasing to 385 at the 2011 census.

The Grade I listed parish church of St Mary is the former abbey church. It is on Historic England's list of buildings at risk.

The village contains Abbey Dore Court, a large country house built in 1861.

Abbeydore railway station closed in 1941. It was on the Great Western Railway branch line linking Pontrilas and Hay-on-Wye. The railway always spelt the name of the village as one word.

References

External links

 Dore Abbey
 Dore Abbey: Interactive Guidebook

Villages in Herefordshire